Yankov is a Bulgarian masculine surname, its feminine counterpart is Yankova. It may refer to:

Chavdar Yankov (born 1984), Bulgarian football player
Ivan Yankov (born 1951), Bulgarian wrestler 
Petko Yankov (born 1977), Bulgarian sprinter 
Radoslav Yankov (born 1990), Bulgarian snowboarder 
Radoslava Mavrodieva-Yankova (born 1987), Bulgarian shot putter
Ventsislav Yankov (1926–2022), Bulgarian pianist and pedagogue
Zlatko Yankov (born 1966), Bulgarian football manager and former player

See also
Yankov Gap

Bulgarian-language surnames
Patronymic surnames